Poland participated in the Junior Eurovision Song Contest 2017 which took place on 26 November 2017 in Tbilisi, Georgia. The Polish broadcaster Telewizja Polska (TVP) was responsible for organising their entry for the contest. A national final, which took place on 1 October 2017, saw ten competing acts participating in a televised production where the winner was determined by a 50/50 combination of votes from a jury made up of music professionals and a public telephone vote. Alicja Rega was chosen as the winner of the selection and she got the right to represent Poland with the song "Mój dom".

Background

Prior to the 2017 Contest, Poland has participated in the Junior Eurovision Song Contest three times. In 2003 and 2004, Poland ended in last place and they decided not to participate from 2005 to 2015. The country returned successfully in 2016. Olivia Wieczorek was selected to represent the nation that year with the song "Nie zapomnij". Olivia ended in 11th place out of 17 entries with 60 points.

Before Junior Eurovision
The Polish broadcaster confirmed their participation on 1 August 2017 and opened the submission period for their national selection. They announced that their national selection would take place on 1 October 2017.

Krajowe Eliminacje do Konkursu Piosenki Eurowizji dla Dzieci 2017
The national selection Krajowe Eliminacje do Konkursu Piosenki Eurowizji dla Dzieci 2017 took place on 1 October 2017 at studio 5 of TVP in Warsaw. It featured ten competing acts participating in a televised production where the winner was determined by a 50/50 combination of votes from a jury made up of music professionals and a public telephone vote. The show was hosted by Rafał Brzozowski, who ended second in the Polish selection for the 2017 Eurovision Song Contest. The show was opened by the last year's representative Olivia Wieczorek, who performed her entry “Nie zapomnij”. Olivia also performed with Rafał Brzozowski as a duet and they sang the song "Mam tę moc”. Natalia Szroeder and Sylwia Lipka were performing as interval acts during the show. At the end of the show, Alicja Rega was announced as the winner of the selection and she got the right to represent Poland in Tbilisi with her song "Mój dom". Alicja won both the jury and the telephone vote.

Key:
 Winner
 Second place
 Third place

Artist and song information

Alicja Rega

Alicja Rega (born 14 February 2003) is a Polish child singer. She represented Poland in the Junior Eurovision Song Contest 2017 with the song "Mój dom".

At Junior Eurovision
During the opening ceremony and the running order draw which both took place on 20 November 2017, Poland determined their running order position for the final.

Voting

Detailed voting results

References

Junior Eurovision Song Contest
Poland
Junior